The 2018 Caribbean Club Shield was the first edition of the Caribbean Club Shield (also known as the CFU Club Shield), the second-tier annual international club football competition in the Caribbean region, held amongst clubs whose football associations are affiliated with the Caribbean Football Union (CFU), a sub-confederation of CONCACAF. The tournament was played in the Dominican Republic between 13–21 April 2018.

The winners of the 2018 CONCACAF Caribbean Club Shield, as long as they fulfill the CONCACAF Regional Club Licensing criteria, would play against the fourth place team of the 2018 CONCACAF Caribbean Club Championship in a playoff match to determine the final Caribbean spot to the 2018 CONCACAF League.

Club Franciscain won the inaugural CONCACAF Caribbean Club Shield, and later defeated Central in a playoff to qualify for the CONCACAF League.

Teams

The CONCACAF Council, at its meeting on 25 July 2017 in San Francisco, California approved the implementation of the following two-tier competitions for affiliated clubs of Caribbean Member Associations starting in 2018:
The Tier 1 competition, known as the CONCACAF Caribbean Club Championship, is contested by the champions and runners-up of the top professional and semi-professional leagues in year 1 (2018), and open to only fully professional leagues in year 2 (2019) and onwards.
The Tier 2 competition, known as the CONCACAF Caribbean Club Shield, is contested by the champions of the top leagues in Member Associations that have no professional or semi-professional leagues in year 1 (2018), and open to amateur and semi-professional leagues in year 2 (2019) and onwards.

The new two-tier format of the CONCACAF Caribbean Club Championship and CONCACAF Caribbean Club Shield, as well as the teams participating in each tournament, were announced by CONCACAF on 15 December 2017. Among the 31 CFU member associations, 27 of them were classified as non-professional leagues and each may enter one team in the CONCACAF Caribbean Club Shield.

A total of 12 teams from 12 associations entered the 2018 CONCACAF Caribbean Club Shield.

Associations which did not enter a team

Venues
The Dominican Republic was announced as the host nation on 15 February 2018. Host venues, all located at Santiago de los Caballeros, were:
Estadio Cibao FC
PUCMM
Universidad ISA

Group stage
The draw for the group stage was held on 15 February 2018, 11:00 EST (UTC−5), at the CONCACAF Headquarters in Miami, United States, and was streamed on YouTube. The 12 teams were drawn into three groups of four without any seeding.

The winners of each group and the best runners-up advanced to the semi-finals.

All times local, AST (UTC−4).

Group A

Group B

Group C

Ranking of group winners and runners-up

Knockout stage

Bracket
The semi-final matchups are:
Best Group Winners vs. Best Group Runners-up
2nd Best Group Winners vs. 3rd Best Group Winners

Semi-finals

Third place match

Final
Winners advanced to CONCACAF League playoff against the 2018 CONCACAF Caribbean Club Championship fourth-placed team for a place in the 2018 CONCACAF League.

Top goalscorers

See also
2018 Caribbean Club Championship
2018 CONCACAF League
2019 CONCACAF Champions League

References

External links
Caribbean Club Shield, CONCACAF.com

2018
2
2018 CONCACAF League
April 2018 sports events in North America
International association football competitions hosted by the Dominican Republic